is a Japanese writer. She has won the Naoki Prize, the Oda Sakunosuke Prize, and the Japan Booksellers' Award. Her work has been adapted for film and television, and her books have been translated into Indonesian, Chinese, Korean, Vietnamese, English, German and Italian.

Early life and education 
Miura was born in Tokyo, Japan in 1976. While attending university she planned to become an editor, but she was signed by a literary agent and started her writing career. She graduated from Waseda University.

Career 
A year after graduating from Waseda, Miura published her first novel, Kakuto suru mono ni maru (A Passing Grade for Those Who Fight). She won the 135th Naoki Prize in 2006 for her book Mahoro ekimae Tada benriken. The novel and its sequels have been adapted into a series of movies by Tatsushi Ōmori, a TV Tokyo television show, and a manga series. Her novel Kaze ga tsuyoku fuiteiru (Run with the Wind), about 2 former elite runners who inspire each other to take up running again, was published in 2006 and later adapted into a 2009 live-action film and a 2018 NTV animated series. In 2008 her novel Hikari (Light), a story about rape, murder, and consequences over time, was published. Hikari was adapted into a 2017 suspense film directed by Tatsushi Ōmori.

Miura's novel Fune wo amu (Compiling the Boat), about a 15 year effort to create a new dictionary called The Great Passage, was published by Kobunsha in 2011. In 2012  Fune wo amu won the Japan Booksellers' Award. A 2013 film adaptation of Fune wo amu, directed by Yuya Ishii, won several Japan Academy Prizes, including Best Picture. In 2016 Fuji TV adapted the novel into an anime series, also called Fune wo amu. An English version of Fune wo amu, translated by Juliet Winters Carpenter, was published in 2017 under the title The Great Passage. Kris Kosaka of The Japan Times described The Great Passage as "stylistically adept, with the shift in narratives smoothly connecting as characters’ stories overlap through time and space."

In 2015 Miura's novel Ano ie ni kurasu yonin no onna, a story that loosely follows the setting and themes of Jun'ichirō Tanizaki's work The Makioka Sisters, won the 32nd Oda Sakunosuke Prize.

Miura has cited Kenji Maruyama and Hideo Nakai as favorite authors. She is a fan of BL manga, and a collection of her essays on yaoi was published under the title Shumi ja nainda (It's Not Just a Hobby) in 2006.

Recognition
 2006 135th Naoki Prize (2006上)
 2012 9th Japan Booksellers' Award
 2015 Oda Sakunosuke Prize

Film and other adaptations
 Kaze ga tsuyoku fuiteiru (Run with the Wind), 2009 film
 Mahoro ekimae Tada benriken (Tada's Do-It-All House), 2011 film
 Fune wo amu (The Great Passage), 2013 film
 Mahoro ekimae bangaichi, 2013 TV Tokyo television show
 Mahoro ekimae kyosokyoku (Tada’s Do-it-All House: Disconcerto), 2014 film
 Wood Job!, 2014 film
 Fune wo amu, 2016 Fuji TV anime series
 Hikari (And Then There Was Light), 2017 film
 Kaze ga tsuyoku fuiteiru (Run with the Wind), 2018 NTV animated series

Works

Fiction
 Kakutōsuru mono ni maru, Soshisha, 2000, 
 Watakushi ga katarihajimeta kare wa, Shinchosha, 2004, 
 Mukashi no hanashi, Gentōsha, 2005, 
 Kaze ga tsuyoku fuiteiru (Run with the Wind), Shinchosha, 2006, 
 Mahoro ekimae Tada benriken (Handymen in Mahoro Town), Bungei Shunjū, 2006, 
 Kimi wa Porarisu, Shinchosha, 2007, 
 Bukka o ezu, Futabasha, 2007, 
 Hikari, Shueisha, 2008, 
 Mahoro ekimae bangaichi, Bungei Shunjū, 2009, 
 Easy life in Kamusari, Tokuma Shoten, 2009,
 Fune wo amu (Knitting the Boat), Kobunsha, 2011, 
 Koguresō monogatari, Shōdensha, 2010, 
 Mahoro ekimae kyōsōkyoku, Bungei Shunjū, 2013, 
 Ano ie ni kurasu yonin no onna, Chūō Kōron Shinsha, 2015,

Nonfiction
 Shion no shiori, Shinchosha, 2002, 
 Jinsei gekijō, Shinchosha, 2003, 
 Otome nageyari, Ōta Shuppan, 2004, 
 Momoiro towairaito, Ōta Shuppan, 2005, 
 Shumi ja nainda, Shinshokan, 2006, 
 Ayatsurare bunraku kanshō, Popurasha, 2007, 
 Monzetsu supairaru, Ōta Shuppan, 2008,

Works in English
 The Great Passage, trans. Juliet Winters Carpenter, Amazon Crossing, 2017, 
 The Easy Life in Kamusari, trans. Juliet Winters Carpenter, Amazon Crossing, 2021, 
 Kamusari Tales Told at Night, trans. Juliet Winters Carpenter, Amazon Crossing, 2022,

References

1976 births
Living people
21st-century Japanese novelists
Naoki Prize winners
Japanese women novelists
21st-century Japanese women writers
Waseda University alumni